WSFX-TV (channel 26) is a television station in Wilmington, North Carolina, United States, affiliated with the Fox network. It is owned by American Spirit Media, which maintains a shared services agreement (SSA) with Gray Television, owner of NBC affiliate WECT (channel 6), for the provision of certain services. Both stations share studios on Shipyard Boulevard in Wilmington, while WSFX-TV's transmitter is located near Winnabow, North Carolina.

History

The station signed on September 24, 1984, as WJKA, a CBS affiliate. It aired an analog signal on UHF channel 26 leasing space on the tower of ABC affiliate WWAY in unincorporated Brunswick County. The station was originally owned by Wilmington Telecasters, a company owned by Robinson and Katherine Everett of Durham. The station originally operated from studios located at 1926 Oleander Drive/US 76 in Wilmington (this address is now occupied by a tire store).

Prior to WJKA's start-up, Wilmington was one of the few markets in the United States without its own CBS affiliate and one of the few in the Eastern Time Zone without full network service. Future sister station WECT had a secondary CBS affiliation until cable arrived in the area in the 1970s while Florence, South Carolina's WBTW covered most of the market with a Grade B signal. From the 1970s until WJKA's sign-on, most local cable systems in the market carried Greenville affiliate WNCT-TV or WBTW while Raleigh affiliate WTVD (now an ABC owned-and-operated station) was carried by some cable providers.

Channel 26's tenure as a CBS affiliate was far from successful. The station operated on a shoestring budget. It mostly served as a "pass-through" for automated CBS programming, and produced almost no local content. The fact that WNCT and WBTW provided at least Grade B coverage to some parts of the market did not help matters either. Further complicating matters, Raleigh's WRAL-TV (now an NBC affiliate), which had been available on cable in Wilmington for decades, switched from ABC to CBS a year after WJKA's sign-on. This move forced the fledgling station to compete against three of the strongest CBS affiliates in the Southeastern United States. Under those circumstances, WJKA barely registered as a blip in the local Nielsen ratings against rivals WECT and WWAY.

In 1994, WJKA along with sister station KECY-TV in El Centro, California–Yuma, Arizona switched their affiliations to Fox; while this occurred shortly after CBS lost broadcasting rights of the NFL's National Football Conference to Fox and before the inaugural season of the Carolina Panthers the following year, the change followed several disputes between Robinson O. Everett and CBS (including one over a planned upgrade of KECY's translator in Palm Springs to a full-power station). On September 18, channel 26 changed its call letters to the current WSFX-TV.

Before the switch, Wilmington was the only portion of North Carolina (and one of the few in the Eastern Time Zone) without an over-the-air Fox affiliate of its own. Until this point in time, the area's cable systems piped in the national Foxnet service or WLFL in Raleigh. As a result of WSFX's affiliation switch, Wilmington did not have an over-the-air CBS affiliate until March 2000 when low-power UPN affiliate WILM-LP switched its primary affiliation to CBS. During that time, cable systems supplemented the area with either WRAL, WNCT, or WBTW.

On paper, the loss of CBS should have put channel 26 in serious jeopardy. Fox had just begun airing a full week's worth of programming just a season earlier, but then as now, does not produce any daytime programming. WSFX thus now faced having to buy an additional 10 hours of programming per day. However, the move to Fox rejuvenated the station. Its main competition was now WLFL. Within a few years, it was one of the strongest small-market Fox affiliates in the country. Until 1996, WSFX also doubled as the Fox affiliate for the Florence–Myrtle Beach, South Carolina market which did not have its own affiliate (some cable systems in the Myrtle Beach area imported WACH from Columbia, South Carolina prior to WSFX's switch to Fox). In fact, the current call letters stand for "SuperFox", referring to its on-air name at the time and relatively wide coverage area. Since the station's over-the-air signal does not reach Florence, the Pee Dee area had to rely on cable for Fox programming until WGSE-TV (now WFXB) in Myrtle Beach took the affiliation.

In 2003, Everett sold the station to Southeastern Media Holdings. Raycom Media then took over WSFX's operations through a shared service agreement with WECT. As part of the agreement, WSFX's operations were integrated into WECT's facility. In the late-1990s, Time Warner Cable in Lumberton began to drop Wilmington stations. This station was dropped from cable in Laurinburg in the early to mid-1990s when it was still a CBS affiliate. WFXB is currently the only Fox affiliate offered on cable in that area. On June 27, 2011, WSFX was re-branded as "Fox Wilmington" and introduced a new logo. Besides sharing the same call letters, this television station and non-commercial educational radio station WSFX-FM 89.1 in Nanticoke, Pennsylvania have no other relation to each other.

On May 8, 2008, the Federal Communications Commission (FCC) announced five stations in Wilmington (including WSFX) had agreed to voluntarily cease analog broadcasting on September 8. The Wilmington market was billed as the first in the nation to convert to all-digital transmissions due to its role as the FCC's digital transition test market. Hawaii shut down analog broadcasting in January 2009 followed by more but not all full-power television broadcasters on February 17, 2009.

Programming

Syndicated programming
Syndicated programming on WSFX includes Maury, Modern Family, Two and a Half Men, and Family Feud among others.

News operation

As WJKA, the station had virtually no news department for most of its tenure as a CBS affiliate. In the mid-1980s, it did air a weekday noon show called Midday offering local news headlines and entertainment reports. In the early-1990s, WJKA actually operated a short-lived news department branded as WJKA Action News 26. It attempted to create another source for newscasts besides longtime dominant WECT and runner up WWAY. Despite the efforts of WJKA and WWAY, WECT maintained a strong lead in the market ratings and viewership counts by consistently holding the top spot in Nielsen marks.

On September 22, 2003, through a new share agreement, WECT began producing a nightly half-hour prime time newscast on WSFX called Fox 26 News at 10 (now Fox Wilmington News at 10). This was eventually joined by a sixty-minute extension of WECT's weekday morning show on September 13, 2006, called Carolina in the Morning on Fox 26 (now Carolina in the Morning on Fox Wilmington), currently airing from 7 until 8 on WSFX offering an alternative to the national morning shows seen on the market's big three network-affiliated stations. On August 31, 2008, WECT became Wilmington's first television outlet to upgrade local news production to high definition level and the broadcasts on WSFX were included in the change.

At some point in time, WECT added a third newscast to WSFX called Fox 26 News at 6:30 (later became Fox Wilmington News at 6:30), which only aired on weeknights and attempted to compete against the national evening newscasts seen on the big three networks. It would be canceled by the end of 2013 in preparation to expand the weeknight edition of the 10 o'clock show to an hour (which occurred on January 15, 2014). On September 6, 2016, WSFX premiered a 7 p.m. newscast. After WWAY stopped producing weekend evening newscasts on August 1, 2009, WECT and WSFX became the only outlets in Wilmington to offer evening broadcasts seen seven nights a week. Although WWAY eventually reintroduced a local newscast airing Sunday nights at 11, WECT and WSFX remain the only channels in the market to air newscasts throughout the weekend.

WSFX currently airs 13½ hours of news produced by sister station WECT. All newscasts on WSFX air from WECT's primary set

Subchannels
The station's digital signal is multiplexed:

Defunct translator
WSFX formerly operated an analog translator, W19CA channel 19, that was licensed to Lumberton and had a transmitter in Lumber Bridge. The northern and western areas of Robeson County (St. Pauls, Parkton, and Red Springs) also do not carry WSFX even though its translator was located in Lumber Bridge. The repeater had a directional signal covering Robeson County fairly well and could also be seen as far north as Raeford in Hoke County and Hope Mills in Cumberland County in the Raleigh/Durham market.

References

External links

WECT

Television channels and stations established in 1984
1984 establishments in North Carolina
SFX-TV
Fox network affiliates
Ion Television affiliates
Grit (TV network) affiliates
Dabl affiliates
Gray Television